Philip the Apostle (Aramaic: ܦܝܠܝܦܘܣ; , Philippos) was one of the Twelve Apostles of Jesus according to the New Testament. Later Christian traditions describe Philip as the apostle who preached in Greece, Syria, and Phrygia.

In the Roman Rite, the feast day of Philip, along with that of James the Less, was traditionally observed on 1 May, the anniversary of the dedication of the church dedicated to them in Rome (now called the Church of the Twelve Apostles). The Eastern Orthodox Church celebrates Philip's feast day on 14 November. One of the Gnostic codices discovered in the Nag Hammadi library in 1945 bears Philip's name in its title, on the bottom line.

New Testament
The Synoptic Gospels list Philip as one of the apostles. The Gospel of John recounts Philip's calling as a disciple of Jesus. Philip is described as a disciple from the city of Bethsaida, and the evangelist connects him with Andrew and Peter, who were from the same town. He also was among those surrounding John the Baptist when the latter first pointed out Jesus as the Lamb of God. It was Philip who first introduced Nathanael (sometimes identified with Bartholomew) to Jesus. According to Butler, Philip was among those attending the wedding at Cana.

Of the four Gospels, Philip figures most prominently in the Gospel of John. Jesus tests Philip (John 6:6) when he asks him how to feed the 5,000 people. Later he appears as a link to the Greek community. Philip bore a Greek name, could likely speak Greek, and may have been known to the Greek pilgrims in Jerusalem. He advises Andrew that certain Greeks wish to meet Jesus, and together they inform Jesus of this (John 12:21). During the Last Supper, when Philip asked Jesus to show them the Father, he provides Jesus the opportunity to teach his disciples about the unity of the Father and the Son.

Philip the Apostle should not be confused with Philip the Evangelist, who was appointed with Stephen to oversee charitable distributions (Acts 6:5).

Christian tradition

An early extra-biblical story about St. Philip is preserved in the apocryphal Letter from Peter to Philip, one of the texts in the Nag Hammadi Library, and dated to the end of the 2nd century or early 3rd. This text begins with a letter from St. Peter to St. Philip, asking him to rejoin the other apostles who had gathered at the Mount of Olives. Fred Lapham believes that this letter indicates an early tradition that "at some point between the Resurrection of Jesus and the final parting of his risen presence from the disciples, Philip had undertaken a sole missionary enterprise, and was, for some reason, reluctant to return to the rest of the Apostles." This mission is in harmony with the later tradition that each disciple was given a specific missionary charge. Lapham explains the central section, a Gnostic dialogue between the risen Christ and his disciples, as a later insertion.

Later stories about Philip's life can be found in the anonymous Acts of Philip, probably written by a contemporary of Eusebius. This non-canonical book recounts the preaching and miracles of Philip. Following the resurrection of Jesus, Philip was sent with his sister Mariamne and Bartholomew to preach in Greece, Phrygia, and Syria. Included in the Acts of Philip is an appendix, entitled "Of the Journey of Philip the Apostle: From the Fifteenth Act Until the End, and Among Them the Martyrdom." This appendix gives an embellished account of Philip's martyrdom in the city of Hierapolis. According to this account, through a miraculous healing and his preaching Philip converted the wife of the proconsul of the city. This enraged the proconsul, and he had Philip, Bartholomew, and Mariamne all tortured. Philip and Bartholomew were then crucified upside-down, and Philip preached from his cross. As a result of Philip's preaching the crowd released Bartholomew from his cross, but Philip insisted that they not release him, and Philip died on the cross. Philip is also said to have been martyred by beheading, rather than crucifixion, in the city of Hierapolis.

Nowadays relics of Philip the Apostle are in the crypt of Basilica Santi Apostoli, Rome, as well as the Church of St. Philip the Apostle in Cheektowaga, New York.

Iconography

Philip is commonly associated with the symbol of the Latin cross. Other symbols assigned to Philip include: the cross with the two loaves (because of his answer to the Lord in John 6:7), a basket filled with bread, a spear with the patriarchal cross, and a cross with a carpenter's square.

Veneration 
Philip is remembered (with James) in the Church of England with a Festival on 1 May.

The Holy and All-praised Apostle Philip is commemorated on 14 November and 30 June (Synaxis of the Holy, Glorious and All-Praised Twelve Apostles) in the Eastern Orthodox Church.

His feast day begins the Nativity Fast in the Eastern Orthodox Church, that is called Philip's Fast (or the Philippian Fast), the Fast is Eastern equivalent of Western Advent.

Patronage
Saint Philip is the patron saint of hatters.

Possible tomb location

In 2011, Italian archaeologist Francesco D'Andria claimed to have discovered the original tomb of Philip during excavations in ancient Hierapolis, close to the modern Turkish city of Denizli. This ancient three-naved basilica, the Church of the Sepulchre, is one of the focal points of an entire ancient pilgrimage hill complex dedicated to Philip. Ancient Greek prayers are carved into the walls of the tomb and church venerating Philip the Apostle, and a coin from the Byzantine era show Philip holding bread (John 6) with this specific three-naved church in the background and Martyrion in the background, removing all doubts about it being the original tomb of the Apostle and church. The church built on his Martyrion and tomb were places of intense veneration for centuries: In Philip's Church of the Sepulchre the marble floors were worn down by thousands of people.

In 2012, Bartholomew, the patriarch of Constantinople and primate of the Orthodox church, celebrated the liturgy of St. Philip here and in the Martyrion of the Apostle.

See also
 Gospel of Philip
 List of biblical figures identified in extra-biblical sources
 Philip the Evangelist
 Saint Philip the Apostle, patron saint archive

Notes

References

External links 

 Catholic Encyclopedia: Apostle article regarding the title "Apostle" from the Catholic Encyclopedia
 Catholic Forum: St. Philip
 Holy, All-Praised Apostle Philip Orthodox icon and synaxarion

1st-century Christian martyrs
80 deaths
Christian saints from the New Testament
People celebrated in the Lutheran liturgical calendar
People executed by crucifixion
Saints from the Holy Land
Twelve Apostles
Year of birth unknown
People from Bethsaida
Anglican saints